Jauja Province is a Peruvian province. It is one of the nine provinces of the Junín Region. To the north it borders with the Yauli, Tarma and Chanchamayo Provinces. To the east with the Satipo Province, to the south with the  Concepción Province and to the west with the Lima Region. The capital of the Jauja Province is the city of Jauja (Quechua: Shausha or Sausa). The city was founded by Francisco Pizarro as the first capital of Peru.

Before the arrival of the Spaniards the province was called Hatun Xauxa (Quechua spelling variants: Hatun Shawsha or Hatun Sausa) and it was the main center of the nation Hatunwanka Xauxa, that consisted of Tawantinsuyu after the expansion of Pachakutiq Inca.

Geography 
The province lies in the Nor Yauyos-Cochas Landscape Reserve. The Paryaqaqa mountain range traverses the province. Other mountain are listed below:

Some of the largest lakes of the province are Antaqucha, Asulqucha, Challwaqucha, Llaksaqucha, Mankhaqucha, Pumaqucha, Qarwaqucha, Ñawinqucha, Warmiqucha, Wich'iqucha and Yuraqqucha.

Political division 
The Province of Jauja is divided into 34 districts:

See also 
 Quri Winchus
 Tipiqucha
 Tunanmarka
 Waqlamarka

References

External links 
 Information on Jauja
 Pictures and Information on Jauja

Provinces of the Junín Region